The PMP Floating Bridge ( "pontoon / bridge park") is a type of mobile pontoon bridge designed by the Soviet Union after World War II. The bridge's design enables for a quick assembly of its parts. It has a carrying capacity of 60 tons. The bridge was originally mounted on a KrAZ-214, but later transferred to a KrAZ-255. During the process of its deployment, a truck carrying the bridge is backed alongside the edge of a body of water. The bridge is then rolled off where it unfolds automatically. The bridge spans 382 metres, load capacity 20 tons, or 227 m, load capacity 60 tons, with 32 river pontoons, 12 bridging boats and four shore pontoons.

The PMP was superseded by the PPS-84 and later the PP-91 bridge system after the breakup of the Soviet Union. The system employs 15 ton Ural-53236 trucks and BMK-225 bridging boats. The latest variant of the PP-91 system is the PP-2005 which uses KamAZ 63501 trucks and BMK-MT motorboats.

See also
PM M71 Floating Bridge

References

Pontoon bridges
Military equipment of the Soviet Union
Military bridging equipment
Portable bridges